Elaver is a genus of sac spiders first described by Octavius Pickard-Cambridge in 1898.

Species
 it contains fifty-three species:

Elaver achuca (Roddy, 1966) — USA
Elaver albicans (Franganillo, 1930) — Cuba, Jamaica
Elaver arawakan Saturnino & Bonaldo, 2015 — Haiti
Elaver balboae (Chickering, 1937) — Panama to Brazil, Cuba
Elaver barroana (Chickering, 1937) — Panama
Elaver beni Saturnino & Bonaldo, 2015 — Peru, Brazil, Bolivia
Elaver brevipes (Keyserling, 1891) — Brazil, Argentina
Elaver calcarata (Kraus, 1955) — Mexico, El Salvador, Costa Rica
Elaver candelaria Saturnino & Bonaldo, 2015 — Mexico
Elaver carlota (Bryant, 1940) — Cuba
Elaver chisosa (Roddy, 1966) — USA
Elaver crinophora (Franganillo, 1934) — Cuba
Elaver crocota (O. Pickard-Cambridge, 1896) — Mexico
Elaver darwichi Saturnino & Bonaldo, 2015 — Panama, Ecuador
Elaver depuncta O. Pickard-Cambridge, 1898 — Mexico
Elaver elaver (Bryant, 1940) — Cuba
Elaver excepta (L. Koch, 1866) — USA, Canada, Caribbean
Elaver grandivulva (Mello-Leitão, 1930) — Brazil, Bolivia
Elaver helenae Saturnino & Bonaldo, 2015 — Mexico
Elaver hortoni (Chickering, 1937) — Panama
Elaver implicata (Gertsch, 1941) — Hispaniola
Elaver juana (Bryant, 1940) — Cuba, Bahama Is.
Elaver juruti Saturnino & Bonaldo, 2015 — Brazil
Elaver kawitpaaia (Barrion & Litsinger, 1995) — Philippines
Elaver kohlsi (Gertsch & Jellison, 1939) — USA
Elaver linguata (F. O. Pickard-Cambridge, 1900) — Guatemala
Elaver lizae Saturnino & Bonaldo, 2015 — Costa Rica
Elaver lutescens (Schmidt, 1971) — Panama to Brazil
Elaver madera (Roddy, 1966) — USA
Elaver mirabilis (O. Pickard-Cambridge, 1896) — Mexico, Belize, Nicaragua
Elaver mulaiki (Gertsch, 1935) — USA
Elaver multinotata (Chickering, 1937) — Costa Rica, Panama, Colombia, Venezuela, Peru, Brazil
Elaver orvillei (Chickering, 1937) — Panama
Elaver placida O. Pickard-Cambridge, 1898 — Mexico
Elaver portoricensis (Petrunkevitch, 1930) — Puerto Rico, Virgin Is.
Elaver quadrata (Kraus, 1955) — El Salvador
Elaver richardi (Gertsch, 1941) — Honduras
Elaver sericea O. Pickard-Cambridge, 1898 — Mexico
Elaver shinguito Saturnino & Bonaldo, 2015 — Colombia, Peru, Brazil
Elaver sigillata (Petrunkevitch, 1925) — Panama, Colombia, Peru, Brazil
Elaver simplex (O. Pickard-Cambridge, 1896) — Guatemala
Elaver tenera (Franganillo, 1935) — Cuba
Elaver tenuis (Franganillo, 1935) — Cuba
Elaver texana (Gertsch, 1933) — USA, Mexico
Elaver tigrina O. Pickard-Cambridge, 1898 — Mexico, Costa Rica
Elaver tourinhoae Saturnino & Bonaldo, 2015 — Colombia, Brazil
Elaver tricuspis (F. O. Pickard-Cambridge, 1900) — Guatemala, Panama
Elaver tristani (Banks, 1909) — Costa Rica
Elaver tumivulva (Banks, 1909) — Costa Rica
Elaver turongdaliriana (Barrion & Litsinger, 1995) — Philippines
Elaver valvula (F. O. Pickard-Cambridge, 1900) — Panama
Elaver vieirae Saturnino & Bonaldo, 2015 — Brazil, Peru
Elaver wheeleri (Roewer, 1933) — USA, Mexico

References

External links

Araneomorphae genera
Clubionidae
Cosmopolitan spiders